is a retired Japanese judo wrestler.

Moriyama is from Hakodate, Hokkaidō and began judo at the age of a junior high school second grader.

When she was a student of Tokai University, she studied under former world champion, Nobuyuki Sato and got bronze medal of World Championships in 1984. In the next year, she won the gold medal at Asian Championships, All-Japan Selected Championships, Kodokan Cup and All-Japan University Championships with her proud skill, Osotogari and Newaza

She retired and became a teacher of the senior high school in Hokkaidō after graduation at a university in 1986. As of 2010, Moriyama coaches judo at high school in Kanagawa Prefecture.

Achievements
1979 - All-Japan Selected Championships (-65 kg) 2nd
1980 - All-Japan Selected Championships (-61 kg) 2nd
1981 - All-Japan Selected Championships (-61 kg) 2nd
1982 - All-Japan Selected Championships (-61 kg) 1st
1983 - All-Japan Selected Championships (-61 kg) 1st
1984 - World Championships (-61 kg) 3rd
 - All-Japan Selected Championships (-61 kg) 1st
1985 - Asian Championships (-61 kg) 1st
 - All-Japan Selected Championships (-61 kg) 1st
 - All-Japan University Championships (Openweight only) 1st
1986 - All-Japan Championships (Openweight only) 1st

References 

Japanese female judoka
Tokai University alumni
People from Hakodate
1964 births
Living people